The Shire of Morawa is a local government area in the Mid West region of Western Australia, about  east-southeast of the city of Geraldton and about  north of the state capital, Perth.

History

The Shire of Morawa originated as the Morawa Road District, established on 27 April 1928 when the Perenjori-Morawa Road District (which had separated from the Upper Irwin Road District in 1916), split into separate Morawa and Perenjori road districts.

On 1 July 1961, Morawa became a shire following the passage of the Local Government Act 1960, which reformed all remaining road districts into shires.

On 18 September 2009, the Shires of Mingenew, Three Springs, Morawa and Perenjori announced their intention to amalgamate. A formal agreement was signed five days later, and the name Billeranga was later chosen. However, by February 2011, community pressure had led to the negotiations stalling, and on 16 April 2011, voters from the Shire of Perenjori defeated the proposal at a referendum.

Wards
The Shire is no longer divided into wards and the seven councillors sit at large. Prior to the 1997 election, the Shire was divided into wards:

 Town Ward (three councillors)
 Central Ward (two councillors)
 North Ward (two councillors)
 South Ward (two councillors)
 Pintharuka Ward (two councillors)

Towns and localities
The towns and localities of the Shire of Morawa with population and size figures based on the most recent Australian census:

Population
Prior to 1933 the census area was incorporated in the Perenjori-Morawa Road District.

Heritage-listed places

As of 2023, 54 places are heritage-listed in the Shire of Morawa, of which six are on the State Register of Heritage Places.

References

External links
 

 
Morawa